Krieau  is a station on  of the Vienna underground railway (U-Bahn) network. It is located in the Leopoldstadt district of the city, and is the station that serves both Messe Wien as well as the new campus of the Vienna University of Economics and Business. It opened in 2008. Krieau Station was originally to be named Trabrennstraße, but the planned name was changed in 2006, two years before the station opened.

Artwork 
In October 2013 the French graffiti artist Honet was commissioned by Wiener Linien and KÖR Kunst im öffentlichen Raum (Public Art Vienna) to create an artwork on 14 concrete pillars of the station's elevated metro track. His work titled Totem Modern shows the faces of cartoon superheroes and sci-fi characters of the 1970s, reflecting the "erstwhile function of columns as historically and religiously charged objects from a present-day point of view" turning them into "cult objects".

Honet was followed in April 2014 by the Brazilian graffiti artist Speto who created an artwork titled 3 Brothers dedicated to the Villas-Bôas brothers on another 14 concrete pillars of the metro track. Honoring the brothers' legacy as champions for the indigenous population of the Amazon basin, Speto adorned the subway pillars with characters from Brazilian mythology like Boitatá, Iara or Boto and tribal pattern designs employing graphic styles of the Brazilian Literatura de Cordel.

References

External links 
 

Buildings and structures in Leopoldstadt
Railway stations opened in 2008
2008 establishments in Austria
Vienna U-Bahn stations
Railway stations in Austria opened in the 21st century